The 1996–97 NBA season was the 51st season for the Boston Celtics in the National Basketball Association. Celebrating its 50th anniversary as one of the NBA's original franchises, the Celtics selected Antoine Walker from the University of Kentucky with the sixth pick in the 1996 NBA draft. During the off-season, the team signed free agents Frank Brickowski and Marty Conlon. However, after a 4–8 start to the season, the Celtics lost 13 of their next 14 games as players like Dino Radja, Dana Barros, Dee Brown, Greg Minor and Pervis Ellison were all out for long stretches of the season with injuries. The team suffered through their worst season, holding an 11–35 record at the All-Star break, then posting a 13-game losing streak between February and March, and losing ten straight games near the end of the season. The Celtics lost 34 of their final 38 games finishing last place in the Atlantic Division with a dreadful 15–67 record, which is the team's worst record in franchise history.

Walker averaged 17.5 points, 9.0 rebounds and 1.3 steals per game, was selected to the NBA All-Rookie First Team, and finished in fourth place in Rookie of the Year voting. In addition, David Wesley averaged 16.8 points, 7.3 assists and 2.2 steals per game, while Rick Fox provided the team with 15.4 points, 5.2 rebounds and 2.2 steals per game, second-year forward Eric Williams contributed 15.0 points per game, and Todd Day provided with 14.5 points per game. Barros averaged 12.5 points and 3.2 assists per game in 24 games, while Minor contributed 9.6 points per game in 23 games, Brown provided with 7.6 points, 3.2 assists and 1.5 steals per game in 21 games, and Conlon averaged 7.8 points and 4.4 rebounds per game.

Following the season, head coach M.L. Carr resigned, while Fox signed as a free agent with the Los Angeles Lakers, Wesley signed with the Charlotte Hornets, Williams was traded to the Denver Nuggets, Day signed with the Miami Heat, and Brickowski, Conlon and Alton Lister were all released to free agency. This was also the final season for Radja, who only played just 25 games this season due to a left knee injury, averaging 14.0 points, 8.4 rebounds and 1.9 blocks per game. After failing his physical exam, voiding an off-season trade that would have sent him to the Philadelphia 76ers in exchange for Clarence Weatherspoon and Michael Cage, he returned to play in Europe, signing a contract to play in Greece, and ending his four-year career in the NBA.

For the season, the Celtics updated their primary logo of a leprechaun spinning a basketball, adding gold, black and mahogany colors. The logo is still present as of 2023.

Draft picks

Roster

Regular season

Season standings

Record vs. opponents

Game log

Player statistics

Awards and records
 Antoine Walker, NBA All-Rookie Team 1st Team

Transactions

References

See also
 1996–97 NBA season

Boston Celtics seasons
Boston Celtics
Boston Celtics
Boston Celtics
Celtics
Celtics